The following is a list of colleges and universities in Texas, United States.

State universities
38 separate and distinct public universities exist in Texas, of which 34 belong to one of the six state university systems.

University of Houston System

The University of Houston System has four separate and distinct institutions; each is a stand-alone university and confers its own degrees.  Its flagship institution is the University of Houston.  The three others are  universities; they are not branch campuses of the University of Houston.

Admission into each institution is separate, and each institution has distinct admission criteria and requirements.

University of North Texas System

University of Texas System

Texas A&M University System

Texas State University System

Established in 1911, the Texas State University System is the oldest university system in Texas.  The system is unique in that it is the only horizontal state university system in Texas.  The system has no flagship university.  The system consists of four universities and three two-year colleges.

TSUS universities also hold the following branch campuses all of which only offer upper-division (junior and senior) and postgraduate coursework:
Sam Houston State University-The Woodlands Center
Sul Ross State University Rio Grande College
Texas State University Round Rock Campus

Texas Tech University System

Texas Woman's University

Independent public universities

Large- and medium-sized private colleges and universities

Small-sized private colleges and universities
Amberton University
Arlington Baptist College
Austin Graduate School of Theology
Bakke Graduate University
Bay Ridge Christian College
Christ For The Nations Institute
College of Saint Thomas More
Concordia University Texas
Criswell College
Dallas Christian College
Dallas International University
Hallmark University
East Texas Baptist University
Hardin-Simmons University
Howard Payne University
Huston–Tillotson University
Interactive College of Technology
Jarvis Christian University
LeTourneau University
Lubbock Christian University
North American University
Our Lady of the Lake University
St. Mary's University, Texas
Southwestern Adventist University
Southwestern Assemblies of God University
Southwestern Christian College
Texas College
Texas Wesleyan University
Trinity University
University of Mary Hardin-Baylor
University of St. Thomas
Wayland Baptist University
Western Governors University
Wiley College

Liberal arts
Austin College
Concordia University Texas
Houston Christian University
McMurry University
Paul Quinn College
Schreiner University
Southwestern University
Texas Lutheran University
University of Dallas
Wiley College

Other non-profit four-year institutions
Park University
Park University, Austin Campus Center
Park University, Del Rio Campus Center, at Laughlin Air Force Base
Park University, El Paso Campus Center
Park University, Fort Bliss Campus Center, at Fort Bliss
Park University, San Angelo Campus Center, at Goodfellow Air Force Base
Park University, Northeast San Antonio Campus Center, at Randolph Air Force Base
Park University, San Antonio Campus Center, at Lackland Air Force Base

Technical (two-year)

Texas State Technical College System

Texas State Technical College-Fort Bend County
Texas State Technical College-Harlingen
Texas State Technical College-Marshall
Texas State Technical College-North Texas
Texas State Technical College-Waco
Texas State Technical College-West Texas with campuses in Abilene, Breckenridge, Brownwood, and Sweetwater
The system administers Williamson County Extension Center in Hutto.

Texas State University System

Lamar Institute of Technology
Extension center in Silsbee

Community and junior colleges

Texas State University System

Lamar State College-Orange
Lamar State College-Port Arthur

Local public community colleges
Alamo Community College District
Northeast Lakeview College
Northwest Vista College
Palo Alto College
San Antonio College
St. Philip's College
Alvin Community College
Amarillo College
Downtown Campus
Dumas Campus
East Campus
Hereford Campus
Washington Street Campus
West Campus
Angelina College
Austin Community College District
Cypress Creek Campus
Eastview Campus
Elgin Campus
Hays Campus
Highland Campus
Northridge Campus
Pinnacle Campus
Rio Grande Campus
Riverside Campus
Round Rock Campus
South Austin Campus
Blinn College
Brenham Campus
Bryan Campus
Schulenberg Campus
Sealy Campus
Brazosport College
Central Texas College
Cisco College
Clarendon College
Coastal Bend College
College of the Mainland
Collin College
Central Park Campus
Preston Ridge Campus
Spring Creek Campus
Dallas College
Brookhaven Campus
Cedar Valley Campus
Eastfield Campus
El Centro Campus
Mountain View Campus
North Lake Campus
Richland Campus
Del Mar College
El Paso Community College
Mission del Paso Campus
Northwest Campus
Rio Grande Campus
Transmountain Campus
Valle Verde Campus
Frank Phillips College
Galveston College
Grayson College
Hill College
Houston Community College
Central College
Coleman College of Health Sciences
Eastside Campus
Felix Fraga Academic Campus
Northeast College
Northwest College
Southeast College
Southwest College
Howard County Junior College District
Howard College
Southwest Collegiate Institute for the Deaf
Kilgore College
Laredo College
Lee College
Lone Star College System
Lone Star College–CyFair
Lone Star College–Kingwood
Lone Star College–Montgomery
Lone Star College–North Harris
Lone Star College–Tomball
Lone Star College–University Park
McLennan Community College
Midland College
Navarro College
North Central Texas College
Bowie Campus
Corinth Campus
Gainesville Campus
Northeast Texas Community College
Odessa College
Panola College
Paris Junior College
Ranger College
San Jacinto College
Central Campus
North Campus
South Campus
South Plains College
South Texas College
Southwest Texas Junior College
Crystal City Campus
Del Rio Campus
Eagle Pass Campus
Hondo Campus
Medina Valley Campus
Pearsall Campus
Uvalde Campus
Tarrant County College District
Northeast Campus
Northwest Campus
South Campus
Southeast Campus
Trinity River Campus
Connect Campus (virtual)
Temple College
Texarkana College
Texas Southmost College
Trinity Valley Community College
Tyler Junior College
Vernon College
Victoria College
Weatherford College
Wharton County Junior College

Private two-year colleges
Jacksonville College (Southern Baptist)
Lon Morris College (defunct Methodist; filed for bankruptcy in 2012)

For-profit colleges
American Commercial College
Center for Advanced Legal Studies (Houston, Texas)
Central Western University
Lincoln College of Technology
MIAT College of Technology
Virginia College (defunct)
Wade College
Westwood College

Historically black colleges and universities
There are 9 historically black colleges and universities (HBCUs) operating in Texas.
 Huston–Tillotson University
 Jarvis Christian University
 Paul Quinn College
 Prairie View A&M University
 Southwestern Christian College
 St. Philip's College
 Texas College
 Texas Southern University
 Wiley College

Defunct HBCUs:
 Bishop College (closed in 1988; site is the current home of Paul Quinn College)
 Guadalupe College (closed in 1936 after fire destroyed main building)

Law schools

Public
University of Houston Law Center
University of Texas School of Law (University of Texas at Austin)
Texas A&M University School of Law (previously Texas Wesleyan University School of Law)
Texas Tech University School of Law
Thurgood Marshall School of Law (Texas Southern University)
University of North Texas at Dallas College of Law

Private
Baylor Law School
Dedman School of Law (Southern Methodist University)
St. Mary's University School of Law
South Texas College of Law

Health science
Baylor College of Dentistry (founded by Baylor University; became a separate institution in 1971 and affiliated with Texas A&M Health Science Center in 1996)
Texas A&M University College of Dentistry (founded by Baylor University; became separate institution in 1969)
College of Health Care Professions (CHCP); Seven Texas campuses and online program serving twenty states 
Covenant School of Nursing (Lubbock, TX)
Parker College
Queen Le University of Nursing
Texas A&M University System Health Science Center
Texas A&M University College of Dentistry (no longer related to Baylor College of Medicine or Baylor University; state institution since 1971)
Texas A&M Health Science Center Coastal Bend Health Education Center
Texas A&M Health Science Center College of Medicine
Texas A&M Health Science Center Graduate School of Biomedical Sciences
Institute of Biosciences and Technology
Texas A&M Health Science Center Irma Lerma Rangel College of Pharmacy
Texas A&M Health Science Center School of Rural Public Health
Texas A&M Health Science Center South Texas Center
Texas Chiropractic College
Texas Tech University Health Sciences Center
 Abilene
 Amarillo (the Amarillo campus operates a regional pharmacy school in Dallas)
 El Paso
 Lubbock
 Odessa
University of the Incarnate Word School of Osteopathic Medicine
University of Houston College of Medicine
University of Houston College of Pharmacy
University of North Texas Health Science Center
 Graduate School of Biomedical Sciences
 Physician Assistant Studies Program
 School of Public Health
 Texas College of Osteopathic Medicine
University of Texas at Austin Dell Medical School
University of Texas Health Science Center at San Antonio
University of Texas Health Science Center at Houston
University of Texas Medical Branch at Galveston
University of Texas Rio Grande Valley School of Medicine
University of Texas Southwestern Medical Center at Dallas
Sam Houston State University College of Osteopathic Medicine

Theological
Austin Graduate School of Theology
Austin Presbyterian Theological Seminary
B. H. Carroll Theological Institute
Baptist Missionary Association Theological Seminary
Baylor University
Brite Divinity School
Criswell College
Dallas Theological Seminary
George W. Truett Theological Seminary (part of Baylor University)
Houston Graduate School of Theology
Logsdon School of Theology (part of Hardin-Simmons University)
Oblate School of Theology
Perkins School of Theology (Part of Southern Methodist University)
Seminary of the Southwest
Southern Reformed Seminary
Southwestern Baptist Theological Seminary

See also

 Education in Texas
 Higher education in the United States
 List of American institutions of higher education
 List of college athletic programs in Texas
 List of colleges and universities
 List of colleges and universities by country
 List of colleges and universities in Houston
 List of Dallas-Fort Worth area colleges and universities
 List of largest Texas universities by enrollment
 List of recognized higher education accreditation organizations

Notes

References

External links
Department of Education listing of accredited institutions in Texas

Colleges and universities in Texas
Texas